The Caradon Hill transmitting station is a broadcasting and telecommunications facility on Bodmin Moor in the civil parish of Linkinhorne, located on Caradon Hill, Cornwall, United Kingdom. It is 4 miles (6 km) north of Liskeard, and ¾ mile (1.25 km) south-east of Minions, the highest village in Cornwall. Built in 1961, the station includes a  guyed steel lattice mast. The site has a smaller towers used for telecommunications and a wireless internet signal. It is owned and operated by Arqiva.

The South Caradon Copper Mine, 1,000 yards (1 km) to the SW of the transmitter, was the largest copper mine in the UK in its heyday, 150 years ago. Many other copper, tin and granite mines are scattered around the base of the hill.

History
The station was built in 1961 by the Independent Television Authority to bring ITV to South West England for the first time. Inaugural broadcasts were from the ITV franchise holder for the area, Westward Television. 405-line monochrome transmissions were on channel 12, Band III VHF. The station was also the first in the area to broadcast television using Band III.

In 1969 it was chosen to become a main station in the new colour UHF television network, broadcasting BBC1, BBC2 and Westward Television. Both the UHF and VHF services continued in tandem until 1985, when VHF television was discontinued in the UK.

In 1992 Caradon Hill (along with Redruth) was chosen as the site of the first commercial radio broadcasts in Cornwall, with Pirate FM taking to the air on 11 March of that year.

Coverage

Caradon Hill covers east and central Cornwall, from Truro and Falmouth in the west to Plymouth and Bude in the east. It also reaches into west Devon, as far as Barnstaple, Okehampton and Salcombe.

Digital switchover

Digital switchover began at Caradon Hill in the early hours of 12 August 2009. At approximately 1.15am the analogue BBC Two signal was switched off. The other analogue signals (BBC One, ITV and Channel 4) along with digital Multiplex 1 were then temporarily switched off in sequence. Between one and two hours later the analogue BBC One, ITV and Channel 4 signals were restored in sequence along with Multiplex 1 which was moved from UHF 34 to UHF 28 – analogue BBC Two's frequency.

The rest of the analogue signals were switched off permanently just after midnight on 9 September 2009. Once the digital signals were reshuffled to take advantage of the space left by the switched off analogue signals, they were then brought up to full power (digital signals were broadcast at a much lower power pre-switchover). This completed Caradon Hill's switchover to digital. This also completed the West Country region's digital switchover.

Freeview HD

Freeview HD became available on UHF 22 on 11 June 2010. All four main HD channels – BBC HD, BBC One HD, ITV1 HD and Channel 4 HD – are available.

Channels listed by frequency

Analogue radio (FM VHF)

Digital radio (DAB)

Digital television

Before switchover

Additional Digital Television 
Prior to 19 June 2019, Caradon Hill used to broadcast two additional multiplexes. This is due to the clearance of the 700 MHz frequency band.

Analogue television
Analogue television is no longer transmitted from Caradon Hill. BBC2 was closed on 12 August 2009 and the remaining three services on 9 September.

In Popular Culture

The Caradon Hill transmitter was referenced in the "TV EP" by Jangly Mark in the track actually called "Caradon Hill", a tale of suddenly no longer being able to receive its transmissions from Swansea at the onset of digital broadcasting due to transmissions from the nearby Kilvey Hill blocking the signal.

https://www.discogs.com/Jangly-Mark-TV-EP/release/14091859

See also

 List of masts
 List of tallest buildings and structures in Great Britain
 Redruth transmitting station
 North Hessary Tor transmitting station

References

External links

 The Transmission Gallery: photographs and information 
 Television coverage map
  Coastal Landmarks information
 Caradon Hill Transmitter at thebigtower.com
 List of channels on each multiplex

Radio masts and towers in Europe
Transmitter sites in England
Buildings and structures in Cornwall
Mass media in Cornwall
Bodmin Moor